The US-UK Fulbright Commission was created by a treaty signed by the United Kingdom and the United States on 22 September 1948. It is a non-profit organisation based in London, UK. Its aim is to foster mutual cultural understanding through educational exchange between both nations. To do this, Fulbright helps students, scholars and professionals interested in studying abroad in the US or UK through its world-renowned scholarship programme and its EducationUSA advice service.

Global Fulbright Programme 
The US-UK Fulbright Commission is part of the worldwide Fulbright Program. This is one of the most prestigious and well-known scholarship programmes. The global programme was conceived by Senator J. William Fulbright after the Second World War to promote leadership, learning and empathy between nations through educational exchange. The global programme operates over 155 countries and has supported 300,000 alumni in exchanges to and from the US. Within the global Fulbright programme, 28 alumni have served as head of state or government, 11 Fulbright alumni have been elected to US Congress, 1 Fulbright alumnus has served as Secretary-General of the UN, 43 Fulbright alumni from 11 countries have received the Nobel Prize (including 2 in 2010), and 78 alumni have received Pulitzer Prizes.

UK Fulbright Awards 
There are several scholarship programmes operating between the US and UK. However, the US-UK Fulbright Commission is the only organisation offering scholarships on a bi-national basis, in any field and at any university. According to its website, Fulbright offers a wide range of programmes including Distinguished Chairs for senior academics, postgraduate study scholarships, professional awards and Summer Institutes for younger students. Since 1948, the UK Commission has supported approximately 15,000 British nationals on exchanges to the US and nearly 12,000 Americans to the UK. In recent years, around 50 UK and 50 US citizens received grants annually in the US and UK respectively.

EducationUSA Advisory Service 
In addition to its scholarships, Fulbright provides information on and promotes US-UK exchange. In 2009/10, 8,861 British students studied in the US, and with the rise of tuition fees at UK universities, there has been increased interest in US study. That same year, another 45,000+ Americans studied in the UK. Fulbright's advisory service is part of the EducationUSA network of over 450 advising centres worldwide. The advisors are the UK's official source of information on educational exchange opportunities to the US. Advisors are able to provide accurate, unbiased information about all accredited US higher education institutions. Fulbright's website provides information on how to apply to US universities. They also offer events on US study, such as their College Day undergraduate university fair each autumn, a Grad School Day workshop in the spring, student and parent seminars throughout the year, webinars and advisor training. Students can also get additional advice by phone, email and in person at their office in Battersea.

Funding and administration
The US-UK Commission is funded partially by the US State Department and UK government through BIS. They get additional support from individual and institutional partners. Fulbright is governed by a Board of Commissioners that includes representatives nominated by the US and UK governments. Work is carried out by ten full-time staff and participants in their internship programme. The Fulbright-Hays Act of 1961 states that the Bureau of Educational and Cultural Affairs (ECA) administers the global Fulbright Program under policy guidelines set by the J. William Fulbright Foreign Scholarship Board (FSB). ECA does this with assistance of bi-national commissions and foundations, U.S. embassies, and cooperating agencies in the United States, such as the Institute of International Education (IIE) and Council for International Exchange of Scholars.

Alumni
The British Fulbright Scholars Association (BFSA) is the alumni association for British Fulbright Scholars. The BFSA is a private, non-profit organisation that promotes transatlantic relationships and international understanding through its network of Fulbright scholars. US-UK Fulbright alumni are also invited to join the State Alumni and Fulbright Association networks.

According to the Fulbright website, the following individuals are notable alumni of the scholarship program:

Legacy 
The UK Fulbright Commission Archive is housed at the British Library. The papers can be accessed through the British Library catalogue. The Fulbright Association has a long-standing collaboration with the US-UK Educational Commission (The Fulbright Commission) to support an annual lecture series held in the UK called the Fulbright Legacy Lectures

References

Further reading
Fulbright, J. William (1966). The Arrogance of Power, New York: Random House. 
Fulbright, J. William (1985). Advice and Dissent, Iowa City: University of Iowa Press.
Clinton, Bill (2005). My Life. Vintage. .
Johnson, Haynes and Gwertzmann, Bernard (1968). Fulbright: The Dissenter. Doubleday.
Woods, Randall B. (1995) "Fulbright: A Biography," Cambridge University Press. 

Scholarships in the United Kingdom
Fellowships
Non-profit organisations based in London
Organizations established in 1948
1948 establishments in the United Kingdom
United Kingdom–United States relations